Guo Ying (born 7 October 1991), better known by her stage name Yamy, is a Chinese singer, rapper and dancer under JC Universe Entertainment. She was the leader of the Chinese girl group Rocket Girls 101.

Personal life
Guo Ying was born in Qingyuan, Guangdong Province on October 7, 1991. She was the leader of the Kuchika, and graduated from the Zhongshan Campus of Guangdong Pharmaceutical University.

Career

Pre-debut: 1vs11 and The Rap of China
Before making her debut in 2017, Ying was chosen to take part in 1vs11, a reality show by JC Universe and there she was picked out along with other 9 members to be given a debut chance. Guo joined The Rap of China produced by iQiyi as a contestant. However, she was eventually eliminated.

2017: Debut with first single, "Ay"
On 23 September 2017, Yamy released her debut single "Ay". In December, her second single, titled "乌鸦" was released on YouTube.

2018-present: Produce 101 and debut with Rocket Girls 101

In 2018, Guo participated in the Chinese reality survival girl group show Produce 101 China aired from April 21 to June 23 on Tencent Video. Guo eventually placed 5th overall with a total vote of 108 million and debuted as a member of Rocket Girls 101 on 23 June as the main rapper, dancer and the group's leader.

On June 23, 2020, The Rocket Girls 101 officially disbanded as their group was a temporary one under Tencent Video that the contract will last only for 2 years. Yamy is now making a comeback to JC Universe Entertainment and will continue to pursue her career as a rapper and dancer.

Discography

Singles

Promotional singles

Others

Filmography

Television shows

References

External links
 

1991 births
Living people
Singers from Guangdong
People from Qingyuan
Korean-language singers of China
Rocket Girls 101 members
Chinese women rappers
Produce 101 (Chinese TV series) contestants